Pavlovka is a rural locality (a village) in Krivle-Ilyushkinsky Selsoviet, Kuyurgazinsky District, Bashkortostan, Russia. The population was 235 as of 2010. There are 2 streets.

Geography 
Pavlovka is located 25 km east of Yermolayevo (the district's administrative centre) by road. Arslano-Amekachevo is the nearest rural locality.

References 

Rural localities in Kuyurgazinsky District